The J-Anomaly Ridge is a bathymetric feature in the North Atlantic Ocean, extending southwest from the eastern end of the Grand Banks of Newfoundland. The ridge consists of anomalously thick oceanic crust that formed as a result of a major volcanic pulse during the Cretaceous.

References

External links

Underwater ridges of the Atlantic Ocean
Volcanism of Newfoundland and Labrador
Cretaceous volcanism
Oceanography of Canada